Zmeurată is a Romanian alcoholic beverage produced from Raspberry (zmeură in Romanian), sugar and alcohol.

Notes and references 

Romanian spirits